The 1886 Vermont Green and Gold football team represented the University of Vermont during the 1886 college football season. The first intercollegiate game in the state of Vermont happened on November 6, 1886, between Dartmouth and Vermont at Burlington, Vermont. Dartmouth won 91 to 0.

Schedule

See also
 List of the first college football game in each US state

References

Vermont
Vermont Catamounts football seasons
College football winless seasons
Vermont Catamounts football